Frederick "Fred" Quine (born 4 January 1941) is a retired field hockey player from Australia, who won the silver medal with the Men's National Team at the 1968 Summer Olympics in Mexico City. He attended Brisbane State High School and played grade hockey for Northern Suburbs Hockey Club.
Fred

References

External links
 

1941 births
Living people
Australian male field hockey players
Olympic field hockey players of Australia
Field hockey players at the 1968 Summer Olympics
Olympic silver medalists for Australia
Olympic medalists in field hockey
People educated at Brisbane State High School
Medalists at the 1968 Summer Olympics